Gulager is a surname. Notable people with this surname include:

 Clu Gulager (1928-2022), American television and film actor and director
 John Gulager (born 1957), American actor, cinematographer, and film director
 Miriam Gulager or Miriam Byrd-Nethery (1929-2003), American actress
 Tom Gulager (born 1965), American actor